The Unst Bus Shelter, also known as Bobby's Bus Shelter, is a bus shelter and bus stop near the village of Baltasound, on the isle of Unst, Shetland Islands, Scotland. It is maintained by the Shetland Islands Council. It is located on the main road across Unst - the A968 - which runs between Belmont and Haroldswick.

The name "Bobby's Bus Shelter" honours Bobby Macaulay, a child who used to cycle to the shelter in the mornings to catch the bus to school.  The local council had plans to remove the bus shelter in 1996, but after the seven-year-old sent them a letter asking them not to and explaining that the shelter is where he kept his bike while at school, the council left it there and furnished it.

The shelter is equipped with a sofa and a television. It is furnished and redecorated periodically. For example, in 2010 it was given World Cup themed decoration due to Macaulay's visit to South Africa to see the 2010 FIFA World Cup, and each year by local residents with a sofa, television, computer and other home comforts.

References

External links 

 The Unst Bus Shelter Website
 Shetland Times article: Website for Unst bus shelter is ‘essential reading for future generations’
 BBC article: What makes one lonely busy shelter on Unst famous the world over?

 Blog post on the bus shelter

Bus stations in Scotland
Buildings and structures in Shetland
Transport in Shetland
Unst